Álex Ubago (born Alejandro Martínez de Ubago Rodríguez on January 29, 1981, Vitoria-Gasteiz, Basque Country, Spain) is a Spanish singer-songwriter. He is especially known for his heartfelt voice and his ballads. He was able to record his debut album ¿Qué pides tú? when manager Iñigo Argomaniz that used to go to Alex's cousin's bar heard a demo that Alex made for his girlfriend. His first album contains songs from that first demo recording; the songs are "Sabes" and "Hay Que Ver". Alex started to tour national radios with his guitar to sing his songs live and get further exposure. Eventually, this strategy worked, and his album finally hit the charts. But he reached absolute fame with the publication of the song "Sin Miedo A Nada", featuring Amaia Montero, which is his biggest hit to date.

Early life
When he was four years old, his parents moved to San Sebastián. He wrote his first song at the age of 15.

Career
Álex Ubago taught himself to sing, and at the age of 20 released his debut album ¿Qué pides tú?, which sold 900,000 units in Spain and was certified 2× platinum in Mexico. Ubago received a Latin Grammy Award nomination for Best New Artist in 2003, but the award was won by fellow Spanish performer David Bisbal. Ubago's album Fantasía o realidad was released in 2003, and was as successful as his first album. Ubago was nominated again for a Latin Grammy Award for Best Male Pop Vocal Album for his album Calle Ilusión which peaked at number three in the Spanish Albums Charts.

In 2019, he collaborated in the CD edited by La Marató de TV3, a telethon devoted to raise funds for the research of incurable diseases, with a version in Catalan of his song "Sin miedo a nada".

Discography

Albums

References

External links

Alex Ubago Official Site
Alex Ubago Official Site in English
Alex Ubago's Official Label Site

1981 births
Living people
Basque singers
People from Vitoria-Gasteiz
Spanish male singer-songwriters
Spanish singer-songwriters
Warner Music Latina artists
21st-century Spanish singers
21st-century Spanish male singers
Alex, Jorge y Lena members